The , Northeast region, or  consists of the northeastern portion of Honshu, the largest island of Japan. This traditional region consists of six prefectures (ken): Akita, Aomori, Fukushima, Iwate, Miyagi, and Yamagata.

Tōhoku retains a reputation as a remote, scenic region with a harsh climate. In the 20th century, tourism became a major industry in the Tōhoku region.

History

Ancient & Classical period

In mythological times, the area was known as Azuma (吾妻, あづま) and corresponded to the area of Honshu occupied by the native Emishi and Ainu. There is some variation in modern usage of the term "Michinoku".

Tōhoku's initial historical settlement occurred between the seventh and ninth centuries, well after Japanese civilization and culture had become firmly established in central and southwestern Japan. The last stronghold of the indigenous Emishi on Honshu and the site of many battles, the region has maintained a degree of autonomy from Kyoto at various times throughout history.

The Northern Fujiwara (奥州藤原氏 Ōshū Fujiwara-shi) were a Japanese noble family that ruled the Tōhoku region during the 12th century as their own realm. They kept their independence vis-a-vis the Imperial Court in Kyoto by the strength of their warrior bands until they were overwhelmed by Minamoto no Yoritomo in 1189.

Feudal period

Christianity in Tōhoku

Date Masamune (1567–1636), feudal lord of Date clan, expanded trade in the Tōhoku region. Although initially faced with attacks by hostile clans, he managed to overcome them after a few defeats and eventually ruled one of the largest fiefdoms of the later Tokugawa shogunate. He built many palaces and worked on many projects to beautify the region. He is also known to have encouraged foreigners to come to his land. Even though he funded and promoted an envoy to establish relations with the Pope in Rome, he was likely motivated at least in part by a desire for foreign technology, similar to that of other lords, such as Oda Nobunaga. 
He showed sympathy for Christian missionaries and traders in Japan. In addition to allowing them to come and preach in his province, he also released the prisoner and missionary Padre Sotelo from the hands of Tokugawa Ieyasu. Date Masamune allowed Sotelo as well as other missionaries to practice their religion and win converts in Tōhoku.

Further, once Tokugawa Ieyasu (1543–1616) outlawed Christianity, Masamune reversed his position, and though disliking it, let Ieyasu persecute Christians in his domain. For 270 years, Tōhoku remained a place of tourism, trade and prosperity. Matsushima, for instance, a series of tiny islands, was praised for its beauty and serenity by the wandering haiku poet Matsuo Bashō.

Early modern period

The haiku poet Matsuo Bashō (1644–1694) wrote Oku no Hosomichi (The Narrow Road to the Deep North) during his travels through Tōhoku.

Contemporary period

In the 1960s, ironworks, steelmaking, cement, chemical industry, pulp, and petroleum refining industries began developing. The region is traditionally known as a less developed area of Japan.

The catastrophic 9.0-Magnitude earthquake and tsunami on March 11, 2011, inflicted massive damage along the east coast of this region, caused  and was the costliest natural disaster ever which left 500,000 people homeless along with radioactive emissions from the Fukushima Daiichi nuclear disaster.

Geography

Tōhoku, like most of Japan, is hilly or mountainous, with the Ōu Mountains running north–south. The inland location of many of the region's lowlands has led to a concentration of much of the population there. Coupled with coastlines that do not favor seaport development, this settlement pattern resulted in a much greater than usual dependence on land and rail transportation. Low points in the central mountain range make communications between lowlands on either side of the range moderately easy.

Tōhoku was traditionally considered the granary of Japan because it supplied Sendai and the Tokyo-Yokohama market with rice and other farming commodities. Tōhoku provided 20 percent of the nation's rice crop.

Subdivision
The most often used subdivision of the region is dividing it to  consisting of Aomori, Akita, and Iwate Prefectures and  consisting of Yamagata, Miyagi, and Fukushima Prefectures.

Climate
The climate is colder than in other parts of Honshū due to the stronger effect of the Siberian High, and permits only one crop a year on paddy fields. The Pacific coast of Tohoku, however, is generally much less snowy than the region's popular image and has among the smallest seasonal temperature variation in Japan.

Cities and populated areas

Core cities
Sendai (population: 1,091,000)
Iwaki (population: 337,000)
Kōriyama (population: 322,000)
Akita (population: 305,000)
Morioka (population: 291,000)
Aomori (population: 278,000)
Yamagata (population: 249,000)
Hachinohe (population: 226,000)

Other cities

Aizuwakamatsu
Daisen
Date
Fukushima
Goshogawara
Hachimantai
Hanamaki
Hachinohe
Higashimatsushima
Higashine
Hirakawa
Hirosaki
Ichinoseki
Ishinomaki
Iwanuma
Kakuda
Kamaishi
Kaminoyama
Katagami
Kazuno
Kesennuma
Kitaakita
Kitakami
Kitakata
Kuji
Kurihara
Kuroishi
Minamisōma
Misawa
Miyako
Motomiya
Murayama
Mutsu
Nagai
Nan'yō
Natori
Nihonmatsu
Nikaho
Ninohe
Noshiro
Obanazawa
Oga
Ōdate
Ōfunato
Ōsaki
Ōshū
Rikuzentakata
Sagae
Sakata
Semboku
Shinjō
Shiogama
Shirakawa
Shiroishi
Sōma
Sukagawa
Tagajō
Takizawa
Tamura
Tendō
Tome
Tomiya
Tōno
Towada
Tsugaru
Tsuruoka
Yamagata
Yokote
Yonezawa
Yurihonjō
Yuzawa

Demographics

The population decline of Tōhoku, which began before the year 2000, has accelerated, now including previously dynamic Miyagi. Despite this, Sendai City has grown, in part due to relocations of people affected by the 2011 disaster. The population decline of Aomori, Iwate and Akita Prefectures, Honshu's three northernmost, began in the early 1980s after an initial loss of population in the late 1950s. Fukushima Prefecture, prior to 1980, had traditionally been the most populated, but today Miyagi is the most populated and urban by far.

Points of interest

Natural features
Mount Bandai
Hakkōda Mountains
Mount Hayachine
Mount Iwaki
Lake Tazawa
Lake Towada
Kitakami River
Oirase River Valley
The islands of Matsushima Bay
Mount Osore
Sanriku Coast

Parks
Bandai-Asahi National Park
Miss Veedol Beach
Sanriku Fukkō National Park
Towada-Hachimantai National Park

Historical features
Aizuwakamatsu Castle
Hirosaki Castle
Chūson-ji
Mōtsū-ji
Mount Osore
Three Mountains of Dewa
Yama-dera
Ōuchi-juku

Onsen
Ginzan Onsen
Nyūtō Onsen
Sukayu Onsen
Zaō Onsen
Iwaki Yumoto Onsen

Festivals
Aomori Nebuta Matsuri
Hachinohe Sansha Taisai
Akita Kantō
Yamagata Hanagasa Festival
Goshogawara Tachineputa Festival

See also
2011 Tōhoku earthquake and tsunami
2006 Kuril Islands earthquake
Geography of Japan
Tōhoku dialect
List of regions of Japan

Notes

References
Nussbaum, Louis-Frédéric and Käthe Roth. (2005). Japan encyclopedia. Cambridge: Harvard University Press. ; OCLC 58053128
—Japan

External links

Akita Prefecture Official website 
Aomori Prefecture Official website
Fukushima Prefecture Official website 
Miyagi Prefecture Official website 
Yamagata Prefecture Official website 
Iwate Prefecture Living Guide for Foreign Nationals 
Tohoku Region Facts and detailed information on Tohoku